Giants Netball (stylised as GIANTS Netball) are an Australian netball team based in Greater Western Sydney, New South Wales. Since 2017 they have played in Suncorp Super Netball. The team was formed in 2016 as a joint venture between Netball New South Wales and Greater Western Sydney Giants. Giants have played in two grand finals (2017, 2021) and have won two minor premierships (2018, 2021).

History

New franchise
In May 2016, Netball Australia and Netball New Zealand announced that the ANZ Championship would be discontinued after the 2016 season. In Australia it was replaced by Suncorp Super Netball.  The founding members of Suncorp Super Netball included the five former Australian ANZ Championship teams – Adelaide Thunderbirds, Melbourne Vixens, New South Wales Swifts, Queensland Firebirds and West Coast Fever; plus three brand new franchises: Collingwood Magpies, Sunshine Coast Lightning and Giants Netball. Giants were formed as a joint venture or "strategic alliance" between Netball New South Wales and Greater Western Sydney Giants and were officially launched in September 2016.

Julie Fitzgerald era
In August 2016, Julie Fitzgerald was announced as the inaugural head coach of Netball New South Wales's new franchise. Two veteran New South Wales Swifts players, Kimberlee Green and Susan Pettitt, subsequently switched to the Giants. Green was named the inaugural Giants captain. Giants went onto finish the 2017 season as runners-up after losing 65–48 to Sunshine Coast Lightning in the grand final.

In 2018, Fitzgerald guided Giants to the minor premiership. However in the final series they lost out to both West Coast Fever and Sunshine Coast Lightning. In 2021, Fitzgerald guided Giants to a both a second minor premiership and a second grand final. However, in the grand final they lost out to New South Wales Swifts.

Regular season statistics

Grand finals

Home venues
Giants made their Suncorp Super Netball on 18 February 2017 against New South Wales Swifts at Sydney Olympic Park Sports Centre. Between 2017 and 2019, Giants played their home matches at Sydney Olympic Park Sports Centre, Qudos Bank Arena and the AIS Arena.

In 2020, together with Swifts, Giants were due to start to playing their home games at the Ken Rosewall Arena. However these plans were put on hold until 2021 due to the COVID-19 pandemic.

Notes
  Also referred to as the Sydney Super Dome.
  Also referred to as the State Sports Centre and the QuayCentre.

Notable players

2023 squad

Internationals

 Samantha Poolman

 Serena Guthrie
 Joanne Harten

Captains

Award winners

Suncorp Super Netball
Young Star Award

SSN Team of the Year

Giants awards
HCF Giants Most Valued Player

Giants Players' Player award

Giants Members' Player of the Year
{| class="wikitable collapsible" border="1"
|-
! style="background:silver;" | Season 
! style="background:silver;" | Player
|-
|2017||Joanne HartenSamantha Poolman
|- 
|2018||Joanne Harten
|- 
|2019||Amy Parmenter
|- 
|2020||Amy Parmenter
|- 
|2021||Sophie Dwyer
|-
|

Head coaches

Giants Netball Academy

Giants Netball Academy are the reserve team of Giants Netball. They originally played as Canberra Giants.

Premierships

Suncorp Super Netball
Runners up: 2017, 2021 
Minor Premiership: 2018, 2021

References

External links
 Official website

 
Suncorp Super Netball teams
Netball teams in Sydney
Netball teams in Australia
Netball
Sports clubs established in 2016
2016 establishments in Australia